The IPSC Canadian Handgun Championship is an IPSC level 3 championship held once a year by the IPSC Canada.

Champions 
The following is a list of current and previous champions.

Overall category

References 

Match Results - 2003 IPSC Canadian Handgun Championship
Match Results - 2004 IPSC Canadian Handgun Championship
Match Results - 2005 IPSC Canadian Handgun Championship
Match Results - 2006 IPSC Canadian Handgun Championship
Match Results - 2007 IPSC Canadian Handgun Championship
Match Results - 2008 IPSC Canadian Handgun Championship
Match Results - 2009 IPSC Canadian Handgun Championship
Match Results - 2010 IPSC Canadian Handgun Championship
Match Results - 2011 IPSC Canadian Handgun Championship
Match Results - 2012 IPSC Canadian Handgun Championship
Match Results - 2013 IPSC Canadian Handgun Championship
Match Results - 2014 IPSC Canadian Handgun Championship
Match Results - 2015 IPSC Canadian Handgun Championship

IPSC shooting competitions
Canada sport-related lists
Shooting competitions in Canada